Ilion is a village in Herkimer County, New York, United States. The population was 7,790 at the 2017 census.

The village is at the northern edge of the town of German Flatts, though a tiny portion is in the town of Frankfort. It is south of the Mohawk River and Erie Canal.

History
"Ilion" is a name for the ancient city of Troy.
The area where Ilion is located was first settled by Palatine Germans under the Burnetsfield Patent around 1725. Settlers first took plots along Steele Creek, which flows into the Mohawk River. Gradually they built many mills along the creek. After the American Revolution, a small community was set up in the area named "New London". This area of the village still has buildings which use the name "London".

The community began to flourish starting around 1816 when Eliphalet Remington created his first rifle. He developed the Remington Arms manufacturing company. The community was stimulated in growth by the completion in 1825 of the Erie Canal, which completed area trade and connection with products from the Great Lakes region.

In 1843 a post office was desired, so the people had to choose a name. Remington refused to be the namesake of the village, and it was eventually named Ilion. A popular, yet unverified rumor is that the application said "Illium", but due to a misspelling or bad penmanship was interpreted as "Ilion".

The village of Ilion was incorporated in 1852. Ilion is one of only twelve villages in New York still incorporated under a charter, the others having incorporated or re-incorporated under the provisions of Village Law.

The current mayor is John Stephens.

The First United Methodist Church, Thomas Richardson House, Remington Stables, and United States Post Office are listed on the National Register of Historic Places.

Demographics

As of the census of 2000, there were 8,610 people, 3,425 households, and 2,212 families residing in the village. The population density was 3,476.6 people per square mile (1,340.5/km2). There were 3,623 housing units at an average density of 1,462.9 per square mile (564.1/km2). The racial makeup of the village was 97.35% White, 0.66% African American, 0.12% Native American, 0.21% Asian, 0.01% Pacific Islander, 0.24% from other races, and 1.41% from two or more races. Hispanic or Latino of any race were 1.58% of the population.

There were 3,425 households, out of which 33.3% had children under the age of 18 living with them, 46.0% were married couples living together, 14.2% had a female householder with no husband present, and 35.4% were non-families. 30.4% of all households were made up of individuals, and 15.4% had someone living alone who was 65 years of age or older. The average household size was 2.47 and the average family size was 3.06.

In the village, the population was spread out, with 26.6% under the age of 18, 8.6% from 18 to 24, 27.0% from 25 to 44, 21.5% from 45 to 64, and 16.3% who were 65 years of age or older. The median age was 37 years. For every 100 females, there were 85.5 males. For every 100 females age 18 and over, there were 82.3 males.

The median income for a household in the village was $31,793, and the median income for a family was $38,203. Males had a median income of $30,069 versus $21,754 for females. The per capita income for the village was $14,264. About 14.1% of families and 17.1% of the population were below the poverty line, including 23.3% of those under age 18 and 13.9% of those age 65 or over.

Geography
The village is on the south bank of the Mohawk River and is bordered to the east by the village of Mohawk.

New York State Route 5S, an east–west highway, passes through the northern side of the village. New York State Route 51 (Central Avenue/Otsego Street), a north–south highway, passes through the village center and has its northern terminus north of the village at New York State Route 5.

Schools
Until its merger in 2013 with the Mohawk Central School District, Ilion Central School District was composed of three buildings: Remington Elementary, Barringer Road Elementary, and Ilion Jr/Sr High School. The athletic team's nickname was the Golden Bombers, the mascot was the Bomber Bear, and the school colors were gold and brown. Barringer Road Elementary, which remained open, nicknames its students the Bobcats. Remington Elementary, which was rented (and later sold) to Herkimer County BOCES and now houses its Pathways Academy, nicknamed its students the Roadrunners. For the 2005–2006 school year, total K–12 enrollment was 1673 students.

In the 2010–2011 year, the district had a $25 million budget and about 1600 students; the 2011 budget proposed a cut of $1.1 million. Prior to their merger with Mohawk, Ilion Central School District was among the poorest in the state of New York.  More than a third of its students were eligible for free or low-priced lunches, a standard measure of poverty. Ilion was promised additional state education aid after the CFE court ruling in 2006, but due to the state budget crisis, this had not come to fruition. Although the buildings remained in fine shape, the district was not able to afford any foreign language education (other than Spanish), and offered only four of 34 possible AP courses.

Forced to merge in order to save money, Ilion CSD formally merged in early 2013 with Mohawk CSD. The Central Valley Academy School District began classes starting with the 2013–2014 academic year, with Ilion's high school serving as the new district's high school. The district competes in athletic events as the Thunder, and their school colors are light blue, navy blue, yellow, and white.

Notable people
 Boots Day, Major League Baseball player
 Christine McConnell, baker, artist, and YouTube celebrity.
 Andrew D. Morgan, lawyer and former chairman of the New York State Hospital Commission
 Eliphalet Remington, founder of Remington Arms
 May Gorslin Preston Slosson, educator and suffragette
 Peter H. Turner, Wisconsin politician
 Frank T. Trimboli, Kansas politician
 Brian Angelichio, tight ends coach for the Minnesota Vikings

References

External links
 

Villages in New York (state)
Utica–Rome metropolitan area
Villages in Herkimer County, New York
Populated places on the Mohawk River